The Harbinger is a 2011 Christian novel by Jonathan Cahn, a Messianic Jew, in which the 9/11 terrorism attack was a "divine warning" to the United States.

Synopsis

Premise
The author says that The Harbinger is a loosely fictional novel, rooted in biblical analysis regarding a real-life, non-fiction connection: a prophecy about ancient Israel that was eventually fulfilled in the eighth century BC when Israel was destroyed, and certain events and facts related to the 9/11 terror attacks against the U.S. in 2001. Cahn calls these events and facts "harbingers," and argues that they show a connection between ancient Israel's destruction and a possible coming destruction of the present-day United States. He also says that ancient Israel received a warning before being destroyed, and that the 9/11 harbingers form a similar warning from God to America.

The author argues that America was founded similar to ancient Israel and the Founding Fathers envisioned a country based on the rules of God and a Light Unto the Nations. The author lists a series of warnings or harbingers that were given to ancient Israel before its final destruction by the Assyrians and makes a parallel between each and the events of 9/11.

A summary of Harbingers mentioned in the book follows: 
   The Breach: The author argues that the United States just like ancient Israel has breached the covenant it made with God at the time of its foundation. Thus the hedge of God's protection around America was lifted on 9/11 similar to the way the hedge of protection around ancient Israel was lifted. 
 The Terrorist: The author argues that similar to the way that the kingdom of Israel was attacked by Assyrians, The United States was attacked by Al-Qaeda. The Assyrians were a Semitic people, children of the Middle East. So too were the terrorists of 9/11.  
 Fallen Bricks:  The most visible signs of the attack on ancient Israel were that of the fallen buildings and the ruin heaps of fallen bricks. In 9/11 the most visible site of the attack was also the fallen bricks of the fallen buildings.
 The Tower: The harbinger symbolizes the fact that after the Assyrian attack, the kingdom of Israel did not repent from its sins but vowed to rebuild its buildings with its own power. Similarly the author argues that United States also did not repent from its sins after the warning and continued its path, vowing to rebuild on Ground Zero with its own power. 
 Gazit Stone: The Israelites carve out quarried stone from mountain rock and bring it back to the ground of destruction where clay bricks once stood.  Three years after 9/11, a 20-ton quarried rock meant to serve as the cornerstone of the new building was brought to Ground Zero. A ceremony took place over the rock, called the "Freedom Stone," in which New York Governor George Pataki pronounced: "Today, we, the heirs of that revolutionary spirit of defiance, lay this cornerstone and unmistakably signal to the world the unwavering strength of this nation, and our resolve to fight for freedom.” Eventually, the stone was permanently removed from Ground Zero after security concerns prompted some redesigning at the site. It now sits in the yard of a stone manufacturing plant on Long Island.
 Sycamore: In Isaiah 9:10, the nation of Israel declares that its sycamore trees have been destroyed by the Assyrians during the attack but they would replace them with cedar trees. After the collapse of the buildings during the 9/11 attacks, a shock wave was created that damaged most buildings around the area. Only one building was not harmed which was St. Paul's Chapel, which was protected by a sycamore tree that is believed to have captured the blast. Cahn points out that St. Paul's Chapel was also the place that the government of the United States prayed on the day of the first inauguration of George Washington on April 30, 1789. The sycamore is known today as the 9/11 Sycamore and a memorial was built for it. 
 Erez Tree: In Isaiah 9:10, the nation of Israel vows to replace the damaged sycamores with cedars, which are stronger. Two years after the events of 9/11, on November 29, 2003, an actual tree was planted in the place of the original sycamore in front of St. Paul's Chapel. This tree was a 21-foot spruce tree and was called the Tree of Hope. The tree itself no longer exists, as it died and was dug up and destroyed and not replaced.
 The Utterance: Or “the vow” of defiance. For there to be a parallel with ancient Israel with this harbinger, Cahn says a national leader would have to speak the defiant vow to rebuild in the nation's capital, which he argues that U.S. Senator John Edwards did during a 9/11 memorial on September 11, 2004, when he quoted Isaiah 9:10.
 The Prophecy: Another parallel with ancient Israel, according to Cahn, is that a national leader must utter the Isaiah 9:10 vow as a prophecy, before such events as the replacing of the tree and the bringing of the cornerstone rock to Ground Zero. Cahn says this occurred one day after the events of 9/11, when America issued its official response to the terrorism attacks. Senator Tom Daschle, who was the Senate Majority Leader at the time and in charge of the official response, spoke before the Congress. At the end of his speech he quoted Isaiah 9:10.

Critical response
American television and radio host Glenn Beck called it "an incredible story", saying that the author's use of novel format was at present the only way to have a serious conversation about God for modern Americans.

American radio host and Denver, Colorado Pastor Bob Enyart interviewed Jonathan Cahn about his book, The Harbinger.  And while Enyart was appreciative of Cahn's efforts to warn America about its rebellion against God, Enyart explained to Cahn, that what Cahn predicted was not a harbinger of things to come and advises pastors against making such outlandish claims that hurt the testimony of Christians as they seek to call the nation to repentance.

References

External links
Interview with Jonathan Cahn, Author of The Harbinger 

American Christian novels
2011 American novels
Novels about the September 11 attacks